Sope Lake is the largest natural mountain lake in Albania.

References

Lakes of Albania